Myoporum velutinum is a plant in the figwort family, Scrophulariaceae and is endemic to a small area near Esperance in Western Australia. It has similar flowers and fruits and grows in similar environments to Myoporum tetrandrum but differs from it and all other members of the genus by having hairs on the outer edge of the petals.

Description

There are 5 triangular, pointed sepals and 5 petals forming a bell-shaped tube. The petals are white or pale lilac, sometimes spotted inside the tube and on the base of the lobes. The tube is hairy on its inner and outer surfaces and there are 4 stamens which extend slightly beyond the petal tube.

Taxonomy and naming
Myoporum velutinum was first formally described by taxonomist Bob Chinnock in Eremophila and allied genera: a monograph of the plant family Myoporaceae in 2007 from a specimen collected near Condingup. The specific epithet (velutinum) is a Latin word meaning "velvety", referring to the indumentum of the leaves".

Distribution and habitat
Myoporum velutinum occurs in a small area near Cape Le Grand where it grows along creeks in Melaleuca woodland.

Conservation
Myoporum velutinum has been classified as " Threatened Flora (Declared Rare Flora — Extant)" by the Government of Western Australia Department of Parks and Wildlife meaning that it is "likely to become extinct or is rare, or otherwise in need of special protection".

References

velutinum
Lamiales of Australia
Plants described in 2007
Endemic flora of Western Australia
Taxa named by Robert Chinnock